Koloman Sović (22 July 1899 – 23 January 1971) was a Croatian cyclist who competed in two events at the 1924 Summer Olympics for Yugoslavia.

References

External links
 

1899 births
1971 deaths
Croatian male cyclists
Yugoslav male cyclists
Olympic cyclists of Yugoslavia
Cyclists at the 1924 Summer Olympics
People from Varaždin
Croatian emigrants to Argentina